The second cabinet of Ion Emanuel Florescu was the government of Romania from 21 February to 26 November 1891.

Ministers
The ministers of the cabinet were as follows:

President of the Council of Ministers:
Gen. Ion Emanuel Florescu (21 February - 26 November 1891)
Minister of the Interior: 
Lascăr Catargiu (21 February - 26 November 1891)
Minister of Foreign Affairs: 
Constantin Esarcu (21 February - 26 November 1891)
Minister of Finance:
George Vernescu (21 February - 26 November 1891)
Minister of Justice:
Alexandru Marghiloman (21 February - 2 November 1891)
Nicolae Blaremberg (2 - 26 November 1891)
Minister of War:
Gen. Iacob Lahovari (21 February - 26 November 1891)
Minister of Religious Affairs and Public Instruction:
George Dem. Teodorescu (21 February - 21 July 1891)
Petru Poni (21 July - 26 November 1891)
Minister of Public Works:
Constantin Olănescu (21 February - 26 November 1891)
Minister of Agriculture, Industry, Commerce, and Property:
Ilariu Isvoranu (21 February - 3 November 1891)
Alexandru Vericeanu (3 - 26 November 1891)

References

Cabinets of Romania
Cabinets established in 1891
Cabinets disestablished in 1891
1891 establishments in Romania
1891 disestablishments in Romania